Raymond Saunders (born 1934) is an American artist known for his multimedia paintings which often have sociopolitical undertones, and which incorporate assemblage, drawing, collage and found text. Saunders is also recognized for his installation, sculpture, and curatorial work.

Early life and education
Saunders was born in Pittsburgh, Pennsylvania and attended the city's public school system. It was there that he met Joseph Fitzpatrick, an art teacher who was encouraged Saunders to pursue art. Saunders received a Bachelor of Fine Arts degree at Carnegie Institute of Technology in 1960. He trained at the Pennsylvania Academy of Fine Arts on a scholarship and studied at the Barnes Foundation before going on to earn his Master of Fine Arts degree from California College of Arts and Crafts in 1961.

Career
Saunders lives and works primarily in Oakland, California. Saunders is a former professor emeritus of Painting at California College of the Arts, Oakland, and professor emeritus at California State University, East Bay, in Hayward, California.

Saunders works in a large variety of media, but is mainly known for work that encompasses painting and transversal media juxtaposition, sometimes bordering on the sculptural (as in Pieces of Visual Thinking, 1987) but always retaining the relation to the flat wall key to modernism in painting. Saunders' painting is expressive, and often incorporates collage (mostly small bits of printed paper found in everyday life), chalked words (sometimes crossed out), and other elements that add references and texture without breaking the strong abstract compositional structure. This lends a sense of social narrative to even his abstract work which sets it apart from artists like Robert Rauschenberg, Jim Dine, or Cy Twombly, with which it has obvious affinities.
 
In 1967, Saunders declared "black is a color". Throughout his career Saunders has questioned the premise that black artists produce something that should be uniquely identified as "black art". In his own work, he looked to separate his practice from the restrictions of identity-driven art, "I am an artist. I do not believe that art work should be limited or categorized by one's racial background."

Besides his painting, Saunders in known for his late 1960s pamphlet Black is a Color, which argues against metaphoric uses of the concept "black" in both the mainstream abstract and conceptual art world and Black Nationalist cultural writing of the time.

Exhibitions
Saunders had his debut New York solo in 1962. He had one painting, "Night Poetry", in the Third Philadelphia Arts Festival. In the late 1960s, he was represented by the Terry Dintenfass Gallery in an era when New York Galleries were almost exclusively exhibiting white men. He has exhibited internationally, spending time in Paris and exhibiting at the Latin Quarter's Galerie Resche. His international exhibits have included venues in France, Germany, Switzerland, Denmark, Singapore, Korea, Japan, China.

In 1969, he was among 100 Black artists from across the country to participate in the exhibit “Afro-American Artists 1800-1969” sponsored by the School District of Philadelphia and the Philadelphia Civic Center Museum. It included works by some of the country’s top artists, including Horace Pippin, Nancy Elizabeth Prophet, Jacob Lawrence, Benny Andrews, Roland Ayers, Romare Bearden, Avel de Knight, Barkley Hendricks, Paul Keene, Louis B. Sloan, Ellen Powell Tiberino, Ed Wilson, Henry Ossawa Tanner and Joshua Johnson. 

His painting of Jack Johnson (1972, now in the Philadelphia Museum of Art) was used as the cover of Powell's Black Art and Culture in the 20th Century.

Notable Solo Exhibitions by date:

2022 Raymond Saunders: On Freedom and Trust, Sonoma Valley Museum of Art, Sonoma, CA; Raymond Saunders, Andrew Kreps Gallery, New York, NY

2007 All Colors: from Oakland 2 Oakland, Joyce Gordon Gallery, Oakland, CA

2005 Paintings, Stephen Wirtz Gallery, San Francisco, CA

2004 Gallery Resche, Paris, France; Schneider Museum of Art, Southern Oregon University, Ashland, OR

2000 Cooley Memorial Art Gallery, Reed College, Portland, OR

1999 Hunter College/CUNY Fine Arts Building Gallery, New York, NY Galerie Resche, Paris, France

1997 Presence and Absence, Sawhill Gallery, James Madison University, Harrisburg, VA

1996 Carnegie Museum of Art, Pittsburgh, PA; Pittsburgh Center For The Arts, Pittsburgh PA; Raymond Saunders: Works of Paper, Miami University Art Museum, Oxford, OH; American Embassy, Ouagadougou, Burkina Faso

1995 Raymond Saunders: Black Paintings, M.H. de Young Memorial Museum, San Francisco, CA; Raymond Saunders: New Work, Oakland Museum, Oakland, CA

1992 Tampa Museum of Art, Tampa, FL

1990 Pennsylvania Academy of the Fine Arts, Philadelphia, PA

1987 University Gallery of Fine Art, Ohio State University, Columbus, OH

1983 University of Texas, San Antonio, TX

1982 Arizona State University, Tempe, AZ

1981 Hunter College, Art Gallery, New York, NY

1976 University Art Museum, University of California, Berkeley, CA

1975 Carleton College, North Field, MN

1974 Pennsylvania Academy of Fine Arts, Philadelphia, PA

1972-73 The Art Gallery, Philadelphia, PA; Providence Museum of Art, Providence, RI

In addition to solo exhibitions, some of Saunders' notable group exhibitions are:

2022 Just Above Midtown, Museum of Modern Art, New York, NY.; Afterimages: Pop Art and Beyond from the Fisher and SFMOMA Collections, San Francisco Museum of Art, San Francisco, CA.; On the Nature of Things, co-curated by Alex Gauber and Alex Fitzgerald, Andrew Kreps Gallery, New York, NY.; Drawing Connections: Raymond Saunders with Laura Vandenburg, Jordan Schnitzer Museum of Art, University of Oregon, Eugene, OR (two person exhibitions).

2011 Now Dig This! Art and Black Los Angeles 1960-1980, Hammer Museum, Los Angeles, CA.

2002 In the Spirit of Martin: The Living Legacy of Dr. Martin Luther King Jr. a traveling exhibition organized by The Smithsonian Institution and Verve Editions.; Houses of the Spirit: Works by African American Artists, Miami Dad Cultural Center, Miami, FL.

1986 Martin Luther King: A Documentary, Eloise Smith Gallery, University of California, Santa Cruz, Santa Cruz, CA.

1983 Recent Acquisitions in Contemporary Art, Part I, Museum of Art, Carnegie Institute, Pittsburgh, PA.

1978 Musee des Arts Decoratifs, Paris, France.

1977 Stedelijk Museum, Amsterdam, The Netherlands.

1974 Weatherspoon Art Museum, University of North Carolina, Chapel Hill, NC.; Montgomery Museum of Fine Art, Montgomery, AL.; Indiana University Art Museum, Bloomfield, IN.

1972-73 Galerie d'art, Universitie de Moncton, Moncton, Canada.; The Art Museum, Rhode Island School of Design, Providence, RI.

1970 The Metropolitan Museum of Art, New York, NY

Lastly, some notable public collections include the Carnegie Institute Museum of Art in Pittsburgh, Dartmouth College, Fisk University, Howard University, Metropolitan Museum of Art in New York, The Museum of Modern Art in New York, San Francisco Museum of Modern Art in California, University Art Museum in Berkeley, and The University of Texas' James A. Michener Collection in Austin. All of these places, and many more, have rights to house Raymond Saunders' art until further notice.

Collections
Raymond Saunders works are in collections including the Museum of Modern Art, National Gallery of Art, Philadelphia Museum of Art and the Walker Art Center.
Other collections he is included in are the Achenbach Foundation for Graphic Arts at the Legion of Honor (San Francisco, California), Bank of America (San Francisco, California), the Carnegie Museum of Art (Pittsburgh, Pennsylvania, the Crocker Art Museum (Sacramento, California), Hunter College (New York, New York), Howard University (Washington, D.C.), the Metropolitan Museum of Art (New York, New York), the M. H. de Young Memorial Museum (San Francisco, California), the Museum of Contemporary Art (Los Angeles, California), the Museum of Modern Art (New York, New York), the Oakland Museum of California (Oakland, California), the Pennsylvania Academy of the Fine Arts (Philadelphia, Pennsylvania), the San Francisco Museum of Modern Art (San Francisco, California), the Berkeley Art Museum (Berkeley, California), the Walker Art Center, (Minneapolis, Minnesota), and the Whitney Museum of American Art(New York, New York).

Awards
In 1964 Saunders was awarded a Rome Prize Fellowship in painting. He was awarded a Guggenheim Fellowship in 1976 and two National Endowment for the Arts Awards the first in 1977, the second in 1984. In 1988 he was a recipient of the 9th annual Awards in the Visual Arts.

In 1976, Saunders was also awarded Guggenheim Fellowship, given to individuals in many different fields and creation under any art form. This Fellowship allowed for Saunders to create many works, possibly his works after 1976. Many of his pieces used objects that were recycled and given a new purpose within his art. Other Awards include the National Endowment for the Arts Award (1977 and 1984), as well as the Schwabcher Frey Award by the San Francisco Museum of Modern Art. The National Endowments for the Arts Award is a very prestigious honor, as only a handful are given out per year, and it is recognized as one of the largest awards to receive as an artist in America.

Curatorial projects
Saunders curated Paris Connections in 1992 at San Francisco's Bomani Gallery.

Political and social commentary 
Saunders' work overall combines expressionism and abstraction with his own personal ideas and experiences. His paintings pick up on these influences within their background, busy surfaces, and suggestion of race. Going through the Pittsburgh public school system, Saunders continues to use iconic suggestions of blackboards and chalk within his pieces. Additionally, Saunders uses his familiarity with Jazz to distort the underlaying commentary in his pieces. With intertwining details of his history as well as popular narratives, Saunders expresses imbalances and stability within the black community in an urban area.

Relating to Black art history as a whole, Saunders was one of the many black artists who worked from his personal experience. Although, he had an extreme distaste for critics who grouped black artists together as social commentators. In his article "Black is a Color", Saunders argues that grouping these artists who discuss social misconduct within the black community does more harm than good. This idea of the Model minority has been prevalent in many other art movements, as it is sometimes seen as a minority's responsibility to pronounce their experience and establish a change.

Saunders, in an 1994 interview with SFMOMA, stated his ideas of the artistic process, and breaking away from any niche critics put him within. He states that "[anything] other than what you think you accomplished, is really not important" in which the processes the artist takes and what they believe the true meaning of the piece is solely what is important. This idea of the artists reflection on their work coincides with the prior ideas shared in "Black is a Color". Additionally, Saunders argues that "the way that I work, it is by design and by default" and that the process of making art and practice of becoming an artist is what makes an artwork special.

References

External links
 SFMoMA Raymond Saunders Interview
 Raymond Saunders bio at Wirtz Gallery
 Raymond Saunders at Lora Schlesinger Gallery

1934 births
Living people
Artists from California
African-American contemporary artists
American contemporary artists
African-American painters
American collage artists
American contemporary painters
California College of the Arts alumni
Artists from the San Francisco Bay Area
California State University, East Bay faculty
21st-century African-American artists
20th-century African-American artists